Liang Geliang is a male former international table tennis player from China.

Table tennis career
From 1971 to 1979 he won many medals in singles, doubles, and team events in the Asian Table Tennis Championships and in the World Table Tennis Championships.

His thirteen World Championship medals included six gold medals; three in the team event, one in the doubles at the 1977 World Table Tennis Championships with Li Zhenshi and two in the mixed doubles with Li Li and Ge Xin'ai respectively.

See also
 List of table tennis players
 List of World Table Tennis Championships medalists

References

Chinese male table tennis players
Living people
Asian Games medalists in table tennis
Table tennis players at the 1974 Asian Games
Table tennis players at the 1978 Asian Games
Medalists at the 1974 Asian Games
Medalists at the 1978 Asian Games
Asian Games gold medalists for China
Asian Games silver medalists for China
Asian Games bronze medalists for China
1950 births
Table tennis players from Guangxi
People from Yulin, Guangxi